This is a list of museums in Campania, Italy.

References

Campania